Notoacmea elongata is a species of sea snail, a true limpet, a marine gastropod mollusk in the family Lottiidae, one of the families of true limpets.

Description
The length of the shell attains 6.35 mm.

Distribution
This marine species occurs in New Zealand.

References

 Powell A. W. B., New Zealand Mollusca, William Collins Publishers Ltd, Auckland, New Zealand 1979 
 Oliver, W. R. B. (1926). Australasian Patelloididae. Transactions of the New Zealand Institute 56: 547-582.
 Nakano T. & Ozawa T. (2007). Worldwide phylogeography of limpets of the order Patellogastropoda: molecular, morphological and paleontological evidence. Journal of Molluscan Studies 73(1): 79–99
 Spencer, H.G., Marshall, B.A. & Willan, R.C. (2009). Checklist of New Zealand living Mollusca. Pp 196-219. in: Gordon, D.P. (ed.) New Zealand inventory of biodiversity. Volume one. Kingdom Animalia: Radiata, Lophotrochozoa, Deuterostomia. Canterbury University Press, Christchurch.
 Maxwell, P.A. (2009). Cenozoic Mollusca. Pp 232-254 in Gordon, D.P. (ed.) New Zealand inventory of biodiversity. Volume one. Kingdom Animalia: Radiata, Lophotrochozoa, Deuterostomia. Canterbury University Press, Christchurch.

External links
 Quoy J.R.C. & Gaimard J.P. (1832-1835). Voyage de découvertes de l'"Astrolabe" exécuté par ordre du Roi, pendant les années 1826-1829, sous le commandement de M. J. Dumont d'Urville. Zoologie
 Smith, E. A. (1894). On some new species of shells from New Zealand and Australia, and remarks upon some forms occurring in deep-water off Sydney. Proceedings of the Malacological Society of London. 1: 57–60.

Lottiidae
Gastropods of New Zealand
Gastropods described in 1834